Life Electric (also known as The Life Electric) is a contemporary sculpture, dedicated to the physicist Alessandro Volta (1745–1827). Completed in 2015 it is located in Como, Italy.
Life Electric was designed by Daniel Libeskind, and was a gift to Como, the city where the architect located his “Summer Session” school of architecture, in 1988.
The sculpture was commissioned by the non profit association “Gli amici di Como”.
The design of the fountain illustrates the evolution of modern architecture that took place over the period from 1920s to modern days, with the emergence of Rationalism.
Libeskind's creation has carried on the tradition of contemporary art in Como, and raised its profile.

History
The construction of Life Electric started in September 2014, with an estimated cost of  €599,926.07. The project, reviewed by the architect and engineer Antonio Gianmarco Martorana Capsoni, and validated by the "Mercury Engineering" company SpA, was entirely donated to the municipality by Libeskind Design and Daniel Libeskind.  Money for the construction work that helped to improve the resistance of the pier, and construction of the statue itself, was donated by Gli Amici Di Como. The initial intention was to complete the project by 1 May 2015, the same day as the inauguration of Expo 2015, but, after 119 additional days of work, the project was finally completed in August 2015.  There had been nineteen days of delay due to bad weather, and twenty-five days for a summer break in August. The inauguration took place on 2 October 2015, and was attended by the mayor of Como, Daniel Libeskind with his family and Luigi Martino Volta, the nephew of Alessandro Volta and Nastassja Kinski; the event was held in the Yacht Club of Como with a buffet, a toast and the presentation of a new ice-cream flavor, named Life Electric, created by a local artisan ice cream shop. Afterwards, the ceremony moved to the hangar of the Aereo Club of Como.

Location
Life Electric is located on the very end of the Diga Foranea pier, which was consolidated before the construction of the statue. The pier is accessible to visitors, and the entrance can be reached from the Lungolago Mafalda di Savoia, which ends with the Tempio Voltiano. The project's intention was to convey a sense of continuity through the approach to the statue. The location was chosen to give greater visibility to the sculpture, and to celebrate both Volta and the scientist Piero Caldirola, after whom the pier is named

Structure
The sculpture is 13.75 meters tall (14.25 including the base). It has the appearance of two opposing sinusoidal projections.  At its base there is a circular containment wall made of stones 75 cm high, containing a stretch of water in which the monument is reflected. The water at the base is 10 cm deep, and its bottom is decorated with a squared motif. The base has been modified to let people sit beneath the statue, and look over the surroundings from a central point of view. The statue has a total weight of 11,000 kg (12.125 tons). It could not be transported by land because of its size, and so it was transported across the lake with barges, and installed on the pier with a special crane.

The original structure of the base would not have been able to sustain the weight and dimensions of the monument, and so it was previously strengthened. This work took place during February 2015, and involved divers building scaffolding to a depth of 3 meters in the lake.

Design

Life Electric takes inspiration from the electric tension existing between the two poles of a battery. It creates an idealistic third pole, located between the Faro Voltiano and the Tempio Voltiano, both attributed to the battery inventor, Alessandro Volta. The sculpture is designed to suggest connections among three of the five natural elements: light, wind and water. Libeskind's artwork aims to create geometries that connects the sky, lake and mountains, elements that typify the Lake Como landscape; the interaction between these three elements produces a monumental geometric power, as a metaphor for Volta's electric power.

The structure is made of calendared steel, coated by 316,6 mm thick steel panels. The illumination consists of a led waterproof system with smoke machines, (with over 300 output points) and was designed to create games of lights during the night, while the steel used for the coating reflects Como and its natural environment during the day.

Controversies
On 22 October 2014 the political party Adesso Como started a petition asking the citizens if they wanted the statue on the lake. By December 28 the petition collected 4478 signatures, exceeding by 278 the minimum amount required to start a referendum against the construction of the statue, which was considered by some architects and citizens as having a negative impact on the lake landscape. On 5 August 2015, the local newspaper La Provincia announced the impossibility of proceeding with the referendum because the construction was at too advanced a stage, and also because of the cost of the referendum, which would have been €180,559

Images

See also
Daniel Libeskind
Como
Alessandro Volta
Rationalism
Giuseppe Terragni
List of tallest statues

References

External links
Municipality of Como Life Electric
Map of Como
Definitive project

Sculptures in Italy
Outdoor sculptures in Italy
Stainless steel sculptures
2015 sculptures
Tourist attractions in Lombardy
Tourist attractions in Como
Cultural infrastructure completed in 2015
Buildings and structures in Como
Daniel Libeskind designs